Okaleke Combined School is a public combined school in Okaleke village, in Elim circuit, Omusati Region, Namibia. The school is state owned. The school currently serves education to Namibian students from grade 0 to grade 9.

History 
Okaleke combined school has been serving education as from grade 0 to 10 and changed when a new curriculum in education was introduced. The grade 10 was removed from the school due to the new changes in education policies. In 2008, Okaleke was one of the schools that topped the region with good grade 10 results with 87.9 percent. Okaleke combined school was also part of the ten schools that received girls' pads from Trifain Shipo organisation.

References

Schools in Omusati Region